Koeripur  is a town and a nagar panchayat in Lambhua tehsil of the Sultanpur district in the Indian state of Uttar Pradesh, India. It is a part of Faizabad division in Uttar Pradesh state. Keoripur is 41 km away from district headquarters Sultanpur city.

Demographics
 India census, Koeripur had a population of 7268. Males constitute 51% of the population and females 49%. Koeripur has an average literacy rate of 56%, lower than the national average of 59.5%: male literacy is 65%, and female literacy is 47%. In Koeripur, 19% of the population is under 6 years of age.

References

Cities and towns in Sultanpur district